"Bunfight at the O.K. Tea Rooms" is an episode of the British comedy television series The Goodies.

This episode is also known as "Cream Cave" and as "Cream Rush Fever".

Written by The Goodies, with songs and music by Bill Oddie.

Plot
The Goodies head west (to Cornwall) to search for gold. Graeme, arriving from a dig, comments: "You'll never guess what I've just found in an old tin mine." Tim asks: "Gold?!" to which Graeme replies: "No, old tins ... and this!"  Tim, curious, asks: "What?" and Graeme answers: "Gold ore!" Tim asks: "Ore?", to which Graeme replies: "Or something else!"

Graeme takes things easy, while getting Tim and Bill to do all the work. When Bill complains, saying: "Now listen, we've been doing all the hard work, and you've just been sitting around all day!" Graeme says soothingly: "Lads, lads... somebody has to sit around all day."

The Goodies strike cream in an old mine – and Graeme files the claim for the cream in his own name, forsaking the other two, who are about to leave Cornwall broke and dejected. Tim and Bill then strike strawberry jam and scones. When Graeme finds out, he offers them a poker game, winner-takes-all, using pieces of toast rather than cards, and stakes taking the form of biscuits and later layered cakes (it is revealed that Graeme is cheating – he is using a toaster to pop slices of toast up into his hand).

Things reach a climax in a western-style shoot-out, but with tomato sauce rather than guns – and "The Ballad of the OK Tea Rooms" can then be heard: "For if you double-cross a friend, you'll get squirted in the end".

Cultural references
 Cornwall
 Gold Rush
 Revisionist Western
 Gunfight at the O.K. Corral
 Sam Peckinpah films (the final shootout using Ketchup squirters for blood)

Notes
Bunfight at the O.K. Tea Rooms is the last regular episode to have specially written songs by Bill Oddie. The following special and following BBC episodes would use stock music for filmed sequences. The concept would not return until series 9 when the trio joined ITV Television.

DVD and VHS releases

This episode has been released on both DVD and VHS.

References

 The Complete Goodies – Robert Ross, B T Batsford, London, 2000
 The Goodies Rule OK – Robert Ross, Carlton Books Ltd, Sydney, 2006
 From Fringe to Flying Circus – 'Celebrating a Unique Generation of Comedy 1960-1980''' – Roger Wilmut, Eyre Methuen Ltd, 1980
 The Goodies Episode Summaries – Brett Allender
 The Goodies – Fact File – Matthew K. Sharp
 TV Heaven'' – Jim Sangster & Paul Condon, HarperCollins, London, 2005

External links 
 

The Goodies (series 5) episodes
1975 British television episodes